Julia Lockwood (born Margaret Julia Leon; 23 August 1941 – 24 March 2019) was a British actress. Daughter of Margaret Lockwood, her career began as a child actress at the age of four and spanned 30 years in film, television and the theatre.

Early life 
She was born in Ringwood, Hampshire, England on 23 August 1941. Her mother, Margaret Lockwood, was one of Britain's most popular film stars of the 1930s and 1940s. Her father, Rupert Leon, was a commodities clerk who was serving in the British Army. During the war years she lived with her maternal grandmother in Ringwood, but after her parents divorced in 1949 she moved to London to live with her mother in Roehampton, London.  

Lockwood attended the Arts Educational Schools, London from the age of five.

Career 
Lockwood's first appearance as a film actor was in the 1947 film Hungry Hill, alongside her mother; she was only four years old when filming began. She began to gain leading roles in the late 1950s, often in coming-of-age films such as Please Turn Over. She screen-tested for Hollywood with Columbia Pictures.

Her theatrical career began at the age of 12, when she was cast in the lead role in Alice in Wonderland at the Q Theatre in south-west London. She went on to star in numerous West End shows into the 1970s. However, it is in the play Peter Pan that she is perhaps most remembered.“My obsession with Peter Pan began when I was eight years old. My mother, Margaret Lockwood was invited to play "The Immortal Boy" (as we called him) at the Scala theatre in 1949. I used to sit in the wings transfixed, longing to be up on the stage with her and the lost boys, flying through the air and fighting the pirates.” She first played the role of Wendy opposite her mother in 1957, and then reprised the role the following year with Sarah Churchill (daughter of Winston Churchill and Clementine, Lady Churchill) in the title role. One performance was even visited by the Churchill family. In 1959, Julia finally achieved her dream of playing Peter; she would go on to play the lead role a further three times, in 1960, 1963 and 1966. She is one of only three actors to play both Wendy and Peter, and she is the only actor to have played Wendy opposite her own mother in the lead role. 

Julia Lockwood's television career began at the age of 12, when she was cast in the lead role of the BBC children's television film Heidi and the follow-up TV series Heidi Grows Up. She again featured alongside her mother in the 1957 series The Royalty, set in an exclusive London hotel. Both Lockwoods also appeared in the BBC's sequel series of 1965, The Flying Swan. During the 1950s and 1960s Julia was a regular feature of the small screen, appearing in over a dozen different television series. She is perhaps best remembered in the mid-1960s BBC soap opera Compact, set in the offices of a glossy women's magazine. Lockwood played the role of Anthea Keane, appearing in over 70 episodes. In 1971 she appeared in the BBC comedy series Birds on the Wing (with Richard Briers and Anne Rogers).

She was in the BBC Radio 4 series Brothers in Law (with Richard Briers) in the 1970s.

Lockwood appeared on the front cover of Tatler magazine in February 1965.

She was one of five judges of the Miss England beauty pageant in 1965, alongside comedian Des O'Connor, actress Fenella Fielding, Patrick Wymark, and disc jockey Pete Murray. 

In 1971, Lockwood released a 7" single on the Columbia label. The A-side was titled "He's and She's", the B-side "Edward, Alexander & Joe".

She worked as a drama teacher during the early 1990s at the Arts Educational Schools in Chiswick, London.

Personal life 
In 1972, she married Ernest Clark, a British actor, best known for playing Geoffrey Loftus in Doctor in the House and its TV sequels. She retired from acting in 1977 after the birth of her third child. She and her husband had three children, Nicholas, Lucy and Katharine. She also had a son, Tim, from a previous relationship. Following Clark's death in 1994, Lockwood moved to Spain, but returned to the UK in 2007, and lived in Ilminster, Somerset, until her death.

Lockwood's last public appearance was in July 2015, at the unveiling of the blue plaque on her mother's house in Kingston upon Thames.

She died peacefully on 24 March 2019 after a short illness, surrounded by her children.

Filmography
 Hungry Hill (1947) – Fanny's Daughter (uncredited)
 The White Unicorn (1947) – Norey
 The Flying Eye (1955) – Angela
 My Teenage Daughter (1956) – Poppet Carr
 The Solitary Child (1958) – Maggie
 Please Turn Over (1959) – Jo Halliday
 No Kidding (1960) – Fenella / 'Vanilla'

Theatre credits

Television credits

Radio credits

References

External links

1941 births
2019 deaths
English stage actresses
English television actresses
English film actresses
People from Ringwood, Hampshire
People educated at the Arts Educational Schools